The 2020–21 UEFA Nations League B was the second division of the 2020–21 edition of the UEFA Nations League, the second season of the international football competition involving the men's national teams of the 55 member associations of UEFA.

Format
Following a format change from the first season, League B was expanded from 12 to 16 teams. The league consisted of UEFA members ranked from 17 to 32 in the 2018–19 UEFA Nations League overall ranking, split into four groups of four. Each team played six matches within their group, using the home-and-away round-robin format on double matchdays in September, October and November 2020. The winners of each group were promoted to the 2022–23 UEFA Nations League A, and the fourth-placed team of each group was relegated to the 2022–23 UEFA Nations League C.

Teams

Team changes
The following were the team changes of League B from the 2018–19 season:

The following team changes were initially set to occur in League B, but did not after no teams were relegated due to the format change by UEFA:

Seeding
In the 2020–21 access list, UEFA ranked teams based on the 2018–19 Nations League overall ranking, with a slight modification: teams that were originally relegated in the previous season were ranked immediately below teams promoted prior to the format change. The seeding pots for the league phase were confirmed 4 December 2019, and were based on the access list ranking.

The draw for the league phase took place at the Beurs van Berlage Conference Centre in Amsterdam, Netherlands on 3 March 2020, 18:00 CET. Each group contained one team from each pot.

Groups
The original fixture list was confirmed by UEFA on 3 March 2020 following the draw. On 17 June 2020, the UEFA Executive Committee adjusted the league phase schedule for October and November 2020 to allow for the completion of the UEFA Euro 2020 qualifying play-offs. Following the change, a revised schedule for the October and November 2020 fixtures was released by UEFA on 26 June 2020.

Times are CET/CEST, as listed by UEFA (local times, if different, are in parentheses).

Group 1

Group 2

Group 3

Group 4

Goalscorers

Overall ranking
The 16 League B teams were ranked 17th to 32nd overall in the 2020–21 UEFA Nations League according to the following rules:
The teams finishing first in the groups were ranked 17th to 20th according to the results of the league phase.
The teams finishing second in the groups were ranked 21st to 24th according to the results of the league phase.
The teams finishing third in the groups were ranked 25th to 28th according to the results of the league phase.
The teams finishing fourth in the groups were ranked 29th to 32nd according to the results of the league phase.

Notes

References

External links

League B